Joint criminal enterprise (JCE) is a legal doctrine used during war crimes tribunals to allow the prosecution of members of a group for the actions of the group. This doctrine considers each member of an organized group individually responsible for crimes committed by group within the common plan or purpose. It arose through the application of the idea of common purpose and has been applied by the International Criminal Tribunal for the former Yugoslavia to prosecute political and military leaders for mass war crimes, including genocide, committed during the Yugoslav Wars 1991–1999.

For example, "if three people commit a bank robbery and one fatally shoots a person in the process, the law considers all guilty of murder". The concept of "collective liability" where more than one person can share liability and punishment for the actions of another person is not universally accepted and is considered by some to be a form of human rights abuse, while others believe it is just.

Definition

The first usages of joint criminal enterprise doctrine are identified in post-World War II cases, in which the doctrine was used under the name common purpose (or joint enterprise), or without specific naming.

However, the origins of the doctrine may be influenced by the common law of England, which introduced the principle into criminal law in the UK and other Commonwealth nations such as Australia. A similar legal principle can also be found in Texas, USA, where it is known as the Law of Parties. The notion of collective liability and shared punishment for the actions of others as if all perpetrated the same deed may be much older, and was used to justify extermination of religious and cultural groups, such as the Albigensian "Heretics" and those who harbored them. Critics argue that joint criminal enterprise can lead to excessive legal process and punishments, that it lowers the evidential bar in favour of prosecution, and that it runs counter to the spirit of Blackstone's formulation.  Supporters argue that it ensures those contributing to or instigating a criminal act are properly made to account for their involvement.

The first reference to joint criminal enterprise and its constituent elements was provided in Tadic case 1999.

The Appeals Chamber of the ICTY decided on 21 May 2003 on the following definitions:

Writing about this finding in the Journal of International Criminal Justice in 2004, Steven Powles (a barrister who has appeared as a defence council in matters before the ICTY and the Special Court for Sierra Leone) states that the Appeals Chamber was obliged to make this declaration because there was no specific mention of "joint criminal enterprise" in the court's statutes and that "this is not ideal [because] criminal law, especially international criminal law, requires clear and certain definitions of the various bases of liability, so as to enable the parties, both the prosecution and, perhaps more importantly, the defence to prepare for and conduct the trial."

Post World War II trials

In the aftermath of World War II, the courts established by British and United States in Germany applied this doctrine in the trials against Nazis. The Italian Supreme Court applied a similar doctrine in the trials against fascists.

Concentration camp cases

Possibly, the most well-known post World War II cases are the Dachau Concentration Camp case, decided by a United States court, and the Belsen case, decided by a British military court, both sitting in Germany. In these cases, the accused held position of authority within the hierarchy of the Nazi concentration camps and based on that were found guilty of the charges that they had acted in pursuance of a common plan to kill or mistreat prisoners.

Essen Lynching case
The Essen lynching case, conducted before a British military court, demonstrates the closest link to the joint criminal enterprise doctrine. In that case three British airmen prisoners of war had been lynched by a mob of Germans in the Essen on 13 December 1944.

Seven persons were charged with committing a war crime, included a German captain, who had placed prisoners under the escort of a German soldier. While the escort with the prisoners was leaving, the captain had ordered him not to interfere if German civilians molested the prisoners. This order had been given in a loud voice so that the gathering crowd could hear. When the prisoners of war were marched through one of the main streets of Essen, the crowd grew bigger, started hitting them and throwing stones. When they reached the bridge, the prisoners were thrown over the parapet of the bridge; one of the airmen was killed by the fall and the two others were killed by members of the crowd.

Post Yugoslav War trials

The use of the JCE as an actual criminal investigation and prosecution theory first appeared at the ICTY through a written proposal to Chief Prosecutor Carla Del Ponte, which was developed and authored by American prosecutor Dermot Groome, at the time the legal officer for the Bosnia case, and American Investigator John Cencich, head of the Milosevic investigation for crimes alleged to have been committed in Croatia. Cencich provides an in-depth look at the actual development of the investigation and prosecution theory of the JCE in his doctoral dissertation at the University of Notre Dame, in the International Criminal Justice Review, and his book, The Devil's Garden: A War Crimes Investigator's Story.

Indictments to Serb leaders
The ICTY prosecutor indicted Slobodan Milošević on three separate indictments which on appeal they successfully pleaded to the ICTY Appeals Chamber should considered as one indictment. As the prosecution had not used the same language in all three indictments it was left to the Court of Appeal to decide if the alleged criminal enterprises in the three indictments were one of the same and what was common between the allegations. The Appeals count decided that:

Milošević died during the trial, but he was still found to have been a part of a joint criminal enterprise in the verdicts against Milan Martić and Milan Babić, who publicly admitted his own (and Milošević's) guilt.

According to the ICTY prosecutors indictment, Milutinović et al, Nikola Šainović, Nebojša Pavković and Sreten Lukić, along with others, participated in a joint criminal enterprise to modify the ethnic balance in Kosovo in order to ensure continued control by the FRY and Serbian authorities over the province. On 26 February 2009, the court returned a verdicts that:
 Nikola Šainović, "had substantial de facto powers over both the MUP and the VJ operating in Kosovo, and that he was the political co-ordinator of these forces. It is convinced that he made a significant contribution to the joint criminal enterprise and that, indeed, he was one of the most crucial members of that common enterprise. He was found guilty  "of counts 1 to 5 of the Indictment, by commission as a member of a joint pursuant to Article 7(1) of the Statute".
 Nebojša Pavković "had substantial de jure and de facto command authority over VJ forces in Kosovo in 1998 and 1999, and that he was in a position of influence, including through his participation in the Joint Command. There is no doubt that his contribution to the joint criminal enterprise was significant, as he utilised the VJ forces at his disposal to terrorise and violently expel Kosovo Albanian civilians from their homes." He was found guilty of "counts 1 to 5 of the Indictment, by commission as a member of a joint criminal enterprise pursuant to Article 7(1) of the Statute".
 Sreten Lukić "had substantial authority over MUP units deployed in Kosovo ... the Chamber finds that Lukić was indeed an important participant in the joint criminal enterprise, and made a significant contribution through his control of the MUP forces involved in its execution." He was found guilty of "counts 1 to 5 of the Indictment, by commission as a member of a joint criminal enterprise pursuant to Article 7(1) of the Statute".

On 27 May 2009, the Prosecution filed its notice of appeal in respect of all of the accused except Milan Milutinović. On the same day, all Defence teams filed their notices of appeal.

Indictments to Croat leaders

ICTY found in a first-instance verdict that general Ante Gotovina participated in a joint criminal enterprise with Croatian President Franjo Tuđman with the goal to do "the forcible and permanent removal of the Serb population from the [territory occupied by the forces of the] Republic of Serbian Krajina". Nevertheless, ICTY's appeals chamber acquitted Ante Gotovina, Ivan Čermak and Mladen Markač of all charges, including the one of participation in the joint criminal enterprise. In April 2001, ICTY chief prosecutor Carla Del Ponte stated that she was preparing to indict Croatian president Franjo Tudjman prior to his death in December 1999.

In May 2013, Jadranko Prlić and others were found guilty for taking part in the joint criminal enterprise with Croatian President Franjo Tuđman for crimes committed in the Croatian Republic of Herzeg-Bosnia against Muslims.  However, on 19 July 2016, the Appeals Chamber concluded that the "Trial Chamber made no explicit findings concerning [Tuđman's] participation in the joint criminal enterprise and did not find [him] guilty of any crimes." In November 2017, the ICTY reaffirmed the first-instance verdict that Tudjman, as well as some other senior Croatian officials, had participated in a joint criminal enterprise with the defendants with the aim of persecuting Bosniaks.

Rwandan Genocide trials

The International Criminal Tribunal for Rwanda (ICTR) is an international court established in November 1994 by the United Nations Security Council in order to judge people responsible for the Rwandan genocide and other serious violations of the international law in Rwanda, or by Rwandan citizens in nearby states, between 1 January and 31 December 1994.

At the Rwanda trials, the Prosecution originally alleged that the genocidal common plan had been drawn up in 1990 but this theory was dismissed in December 2008 when the defendants in the mammoth "Military I" trial were acquitted of conspiracy to commit genocide.

Other
Joint Criminal Enterprise is found in some nations and states and may have its roots in the Common Law of England. Joint Criminal Enterprise as a legal concept has been used at the ICTY and - to a lesser extent - at the ICTR, as well as in the Special Court for Sierra Leone. But it is not part of the International Criminal Court's (ICC) Rome Statute. The ICC instead uses the notion of co-perpetratorship, which a number of ICTY judges had tried to introduce at the ICTY instead of JCE.

Criticism
John Laughland, who has been criticized as pro-Serb and an apologist for Slobodan Milošević, criticized the Joint Criminal Enterprise doctrine. He stated that successive rulings of the ICTY Appeals Chamber have allowed this doctrine "to get wildly out of hand", arguing thus that "international tribunals have abolished the very thing which criminal trials are supposed to be about. If you can be convicted of a crime as a primary perpetrator for something which you neither committed nor intended to commit, and if mens rea can be ‘established’ by judicial ruling" this is "introducing into the heart of their systems measures which are the very hallmark of dictatorships."

In 2011 a campaign group JENGbA was organized. It seeks to curtail the use of Joint Enterprise while it claims its misuse as a human rights abuse.

See also
 Common purpose
 Command responsibility
 Role of the media in the Yugoslav wars
 International Criminal Tribunal for the former Yugoslavia
 International Criminal Tribunal for Rwanda

References

External links
 Jasmina Pjanić, Joint Criminal Enterprise
 Peter Zahra, Common Purpose and Joint Criminal Enterprise 
 John Ciorciari, Joint Criminal Enterprise and the Khmer Rouge Prosecutions
 Gunel Guliyeva, The Concept of Joint Criminal Enterprise and ICC Jurisdiction

International criminal law
War crimes by type
Serbian war crimes in the Croatian War of Independence
Serbian war crimes in the Bosnian War
Serbian war crimes in the Kosovo War
Croatian war crimes in the Croatian War of Independence
Croatian war crimes in the Bosnian War
Yugoslav Wars
International Criminal Tribunal for the former Yugoslavia
Serbian irredentism